In psychiatry, stilted speech or pedantic speech is communication characterized by situationally inappropriate formality. This formality can be expressed both through abnormal prosody as well as speech content that is "inappropriately pompous, legalistic, philosophical, or quaint". Often, such speech can act as evidence for autism spectrum disorder (ASD) or a thought disorder, a common symptom in schizophrenia or schizoid personality disorder.

To diagnose stilted speech, researchers have previously looked for the following characteristics:
 speech conveying more information than necessary
 vocabulary and grammar expected from formal writing rather than conversational speech
 unneeded repetition or corrections
While literal and long-winded word content is often the most identifiable feature of stilted speech, such speech often displays irregular prosody, especially in resonance. Often, the loudness, pitch, rate, and nasality of pedantic speech vary from normal speech, resulting in the perception of pedantic or stilted speaking. For example, overly loud or high-pitched speech can come across to listeners as overly forceful while slow or nasal speech creates an impression of condescension.

These attributions, which are commonly found in patients with ASD, partially account for why stilted speech has been considered a diagnostic criterion for the disorder. Stilted speech, along with atypical intonation, semantic drift, terseness, and perseveration, are all known deficits with adolescents on the autistic spectrum. Often, stilted speech found in children with ASD will also be especially stereotypic or in some cases even rehearsed.

Patients with schizophrenia are also known to experience stilted speech. This symptom is attributed to both an inability to access more commonly used words and a difficulty understanding pragmatics—the relationship between language and context. However, stilted speech appears as a less common symptom compared to a certain number of other symptoms of the psychosis (Adler et al 1999). This element of cognitive disorder is also exhibited as a symptom in the narcissistic personality disorder (Akhtar & Thomson 1982).

See also
 Communication deviance
 Literary language
 
 Register (sociolinguistics)

References 

Symptoms and signs of mental disorders
Communication disorders
Autism